A unitary parliamentary republic is a unitary state with a republican form of government in which the political power is vested in and entrusted to the parliament with confidence by its electorate.

List of unitary parliamentary republics

See also 
Federal parliamentary republic

Notes

References

Unitary state
Republic